Kirksville R-III School District or Kirksville Public Schools is a school district headquartered in Kirksville, Missouri.

As of the 2016–2017 school year the district had 2,464 students and 430 employees, including 222 teachers.

Demographics
Prior to 2015 about half of its 20-25 English as a second language program students were of Hispanic origin. By 2015 a large number of students from the Democratic Republic of the Congo appeared in Kirksville, doubling the number of ESOL students and giving it a French-speaking population not previously present. Therefore, the district began expanding its ESOL program.

Schools
 Kirksville High School
 William Matthew Middle School
 Ray Miller Elementary School
 Kirksville Primary School
 Early Childhood Learning Center

References

External links
 

Education in Adair County, Missouri
School districts in Missouri